Leonardo Roque Albano Gil Chiguay (born 31 May 1991) is an Argentine-Chilean professional footballer who plays as a midfielder for Chilean Primera División club Colo-Colo.

Club career

CAI
Born in Río Gallegos, Santa Cruz, Gil finished his formation with CAI, after representing Atlético Boxing Club and CSyD Ferrocarril YCF. He made his first team debut on 3 October 2009, coming on as a second-half substitute in a 1–0 Primera B Nacional home loss against Independiente Rivadavia.

Gil became a regular starter from the 2010–11 campaign onwards, as his side suffered two consecutive relegations.

Olimpo
In July 2012, Gil moved to Olimpo in the second division, initially on a one-year loan deal. He scored his first professional goal on 7 October, netting the only goal of the match in an away defeat of Boca Unidos.

An undisputed starter, he contributed with five goals in 35 matches as his side achieved promotion to Primera División. Bought outright during the pre-season, he made his top tier debut on 4 August 2013, starting in a 2–1 loss at San Lorenzo.

Gil scored his first goal in the main category of Argentine football on 9 May 2014, netting the opener in a 3–1 home win against Godoy Cruz.

Estudiantes and loan to Talleres
On 8 January 2015, Gil agreed to a three-year contract with fellow first division side Estudiantes, for a US$ 1 million fee for 50% of his federative rights. He made his debut for the club on 5 February, starting in a 1–0 Copa Libertadores away loss against Independiente del Valle.

Gil never established himself as a regular starter, and was loaned to fellow league team Talleres on 19 July 2016, for one year,

Rosario Central
On 29 July 2017, Gil agreed to a permanent four-year contract with Rosario Central. He made his debut for the club on 26 August by starting in a 1–1 away draw against Colón, and scored his first goal on 23 September by netting the opener in a 1–1 draw at Gimnasia La Plata.

Al-Ittihad
In January 2020, Gil completed a transfer to Saudi Arabia with Professional League side Al-Ittihad. He made his debut on 10 January during a 1–1 draw away to Al-Nassr, which preceded his first goal arriving on 31 January in a score draw away to Al-Raed. In ten months with the club, either side of the COVID-enforced break, Gil made fifteen appearances for Al-Ittihad; including two matches in the Arab Club Champions Cup.

Vasco da Gama loan
On 15 October 2020, Gil headed to Brazilian football after penning loan terms with Vasco da Gama of Série A; until June 2021. He was given his first appearance by manager Ricardo Sá Pinto on 21 October as Vasco lost at home to Corinthians, after he was substituted on in place of Andrey after fifty-three minutes.

Colo-Colo loan
On March 19, 2021, Gil was announced as a new player for the Chilean club Colo-Colo, not taking a foreigner's place up in the Chilean football as he was listed as a Chilean national.

Colo-Colo
For the 2022 season, Gil signed the definitive transfer to Colo-Colo and left Al-Ittihad.

International career
Due to having a Chilean grandmother, Gil is eligible to represent Chile as well as Argentina. In 2015, Jorge Sampaoli wanted to nationalise Gil for Chile but he rejected in favour of pursuing chances with Argentina.

Gil was called up by Argentina's under-20s in May 2011, but never represented the side.

Personal life
Due to his grandmother is Chilean, Gil naturalized Chilean by descent, getting his naturalization certificate in 24 April 2019.

Career statistics
.

Honours
Rosario Central
Copa Argentina: 2017–18

References

External links

1991 births
Living people
People from Río Gallegos, Santa Cruz
Argentine sportspeople of Chilean descent
Argentine emigrants to Chile
Citizens of Chile through descent
Naturalized citizens of Chile
Argentine footballers
Chilean footballers
Argentine expatriate footballers
Argentine expatriate sportspeople in Saudi Arabia
Argentine expatriate sportspeople in Brazil
Argentine expatriate sportspeople in Chile
Chilean expatriate footballers
Chilean expatriate sportspeople in Saudi Arabia
Chilean expatriate sportspeople in Brazil
Expatriate footballers in Saudi Arabia
Expatriate footballers in Brazil
Expatriate footballers in Chile
Association football midfielders
Primera Nacional players
Torneo Argentino A players
Torneo Argentino B players
Argentine Primera División players
Saudi Professional League players
Campeonato Brasileiro Série A players
Chilean Primera División players
Comisión de Actividades Infantiles footballers
Olimpo footballers
Estudiantes de La Plata footballers
Talleres de Córdoba footballers
Rosario Central footballers
Ittihad FC players
CR Vasco da Gama players
Colo-Colo footballers